A protest that occurred in front of the U.S. embassy in Manila, Philippines led to a violent dispersal on October 19, 2016.

Protest
A protest, led by national minority groups, namely SANDUGO and Lakbayan ng Pambansang Minorya para sa Sariling Pagpapasya at Makatarungang Kapayapaan, gathered in front of the U.S. embassy in Manila. The protest was to demand an end to the Oplan Bayanihan, a counterinsurgency campaign and the pulling out of troops and militias from indigenous people's communities. Bagong Alyansang Makabayan (BAYAN) secretary general Renato Reyes, Jr. said that the violent dispersal, which happened when the protest was about to conclude, was "planned and ordered" by a certain Col. Marcelino Pedroso. The protest turned violent when a police vehicle accelerating back-and-forth hit several protestors. The incident of ramming was recorded by the media. It occurred after the protestors surrounded the vehicle and began hitting it with wooden police batons. Among them were three activists, who were taken to the hospital. It was reported that the police arrested 21 individuals and brought them to the MPD.

Investigation
The SANDUGO and KABATAAN party-list stated that a certain Col. Marcelino Pedroso of the Manila Police District (MPD) allegedly gave the go-ahead for the violent dispersal of the protestors, while others claim that PO3 Franklin Koh — the driver of the police vehicle — ordered the violent dispersal. Pedroso, however, denied the ordering of the dispersal.

On October 20, the Office of the Ombudsman charged 10 policemen after the protestors filed complaints against them related to the dispersal.

In October 29, it was reported that 28 police officers from the MPD filed counter-charges against the protesters for illegal assembly, direct assault on a person in authority, physical injury, resisting arrest and malicious mischief.

References

2016 protests
2016 in the Philippines
Protests in the Philippines
2016 riots
Presidency of Rodrigo Duterte
Police brutality in Asia
History of Manila
Philippines–United States relations
Police brutality in the 2010s